Arangi is a small village of Kamsaar located in Seorai tehsil of Ghazipur district, Uttar Pradesh, India. The village is located in the eastern parts Varanasi division, situated almost at the border of Uttar Pradesh and Bihar, on the left bank of the river Karmnasha. Arangi contains an old monument to Lord Buddha.

==Demography==
 Census, the village has a population of 3,006 of whom 1565 are males while 1441 are females. A total of 425 families reside here. The population of children in the 0-6 age group is 536 which makes up 17.83% of total population of the village. The average sex ratio is 921, which is higher than the Uttar Pradesh state average of 912. The child sex ratio for the Arangi as per the census is 928, higher than the Uttar Pradesh average of 902. The literacy rate in the village was 70.40%, which higher than the Uttar Pradesh state average of 67.68%. The male literacy was recorded 83.29% and the female literacy rate was 56.38%. As of 2011 census the main population of the village lived in an area 36.5 acres and 425 house holds.

Histrorical Population

Agriculture

Arangi is well connected with the nearest small town Dildarnagar by an all season road, and is about 6 kilometers south-east from this town. The nearest railway station is Dildarnagar Junction. In terms of Agriculture Arangi village is good. All types of crops which grow in Purvanchal and eastern Bihar are grown in the village. Farming is done in the village for many years and people of village are much skild in doing farming. The village have 15 tractors 3 combine harvester and all other modern tools used in farming. Arangi is a small village with the total area of 687 acres out of which crop production area of the village in 650 acres. The village also have ponds and many trees and also have solar panels and many other facilities. There are two mosque in Arangi and one Eidgah.

References

Villages in Ghazipur district